L. gardneri may refer to:
 Lasianthus gardneri, a plant species endemic to Sri Lanka
 Litsea gardneri, a plant species endemic to Sri Lanka

See also 
 Gardneri